Kamel Kherkhache born December 2, 1976 in Mostaganem is an Algerian football player currently playing for AB Mérouana.

Career statistics

Club

External links
 

1976 births
Living people
Algerian footballers
Algeria international footballers
USM Blida players
People from Mostaganem
2002 African Cup of Nations players
Association football forwards
MO Constantine players
21st-century Algerian people